Sikar Assembly constituency is one of constituencies of Rajasthan Legislative Assembly in the Sikar (Lok Sabha constituency).

Sikar Constituency covers all voters from parts of Sikar tehsil, which include ILRC Sikar including Sikar Municipal Council, ILRC Piprali, and Dadiya, Gothra Beri, Tarpura and Koleera of ILRC Dadiya.

References

See also 
 Member of the Legislative Assembly (India)

Sikar district
Assembly constituencies of Rajasthan